Chamara Lasantha (born 10 March 1981) is a Sri Lankan cricketer. He played six first-class for Colts Cricket Club in 2000/01. He was also part of Sri Lanka's squad for the 2000 Under-19 Cricket World Cup.

References

External links
 

1981 births
Living people
Sri Lankan cricketers
Colts Cricket Club cricketers
Cricketers from Colombo